The Sound of Bread, Their 20 Finest Songs is a compilation album by American soft rock band, Bread, released in November 1977 by Elektra Records in the UK. It reached Number 1 on the UK Album Chart.  The album was issued in the US in 1985 as Anthology of Bread.  

The Sound of Bread, Their 16 Finest Songs is a different Bread compilation album released in 1982 in the US by K-tel.

Track listing

The Sound of Bread, Their 20 Finest Songs / Anthology of Bread
LP side A:
"Make It with You"
"Dismal Day"
"London Bridge"
"Any Way You Want Me"
"Look What You've Done"
"It Don't Matter to Me"
"The Last Time"
"Let Your Love Go"
"Truckin'"
"If"
LP side B:
"Baby I'm-a Want You"
"Everything I Own"
"Down on My Knees"
"Just Like Yesterday" (...Their 20 Finest Songs) or "Aubrey" (Anthology...)
"Diary"
"Sweet Surrender"
"The Guitar Man"
"Fancy Dancer"
"She's the Only One"
"Lost Without Your Love"

The Sound of Bread, Their 16 Finest Songs
LP side A:
"Make It with You"
"The Guitar Man"
"Been Too Long on the Road"
"London Bridge"
"It Don't Matter to Me"
"Let Your Love Go"
"If"
"Mother Freedom"
LP side B:
"Baby I'm-a Want You"
"Everything I Own"
"Aubrey"
"Diary"
"He's a Good Lad"
"Sweet Surrender"
"Dismal Day"
"Lost Without Your Love"

Charts

Weekly charts

Year-end charts

Certifications and sales

References

Elektra K 56062 (1977 LP, ...Their 20 Finest Songs)
K-Tel PNU 9960 (1982 LP. ...Their 16 Finest Songs aka Warner Special Products OP-1526)
Elektra 60414 (1985 LP, Anthology of Bread)
Elektra 9 60414-2 (2004 CD, Anthology of Bread)
Elektra 8122747562 (2006 CD, ...Their 20 Finest Songs - also - WEA International 74756)
The Sound of Bread, Their 20 Finest Songs at Allmusic.com (link)

Bread (band) compilation albums
1977 compilation albums
1982 compilation albums